The 2022–23 Luxembourg Cup is the 98th year of the football knockout tournament in Luxembourg. The cup began on 7 September 2022. The winner of the cup has earned a place in the 2023–24 UEFA Europa Conference League.

Racing FC are the defending champions after winning the Luxembourg Cup final in the previous season over F91 Dudelange by the score of 3–2.

Preliminary round
Seven preliminary round matches were played on 7 September 2022.

|}

First round
Thirty-two first round matches were played on 9, 10 and 11 September 2022.

|}

Second round
Thirty-two second round matches were played on 30 September, 1 and 2 October 2022.

|}

Third round
Sixteen third round matches were played on 28, 29 and 30 October 2022.

|}

Fourth round
Eight fourth round matches will be played on 12 April 2023.

|}

References

Cup
2021-23
Luxembourg